Floyd Mayweather Jr. vs. Robert Guerrero, billed as May Day, was a boxing welterweight championship superfight for Mayweather Jr.'s WBC welterweight title and vacant The Ring welterweight title. The bout was held on May 4, 2013, in the MGM Grand Garden Arena at the MGM Grand Hotel & Casino in Las Vegas, Nevada, United States on Showtime PPV. The bout was the first major televised fight of Mayweather's career to not be aired on HBO PPV. The card featured some of the rising stars of Mayweather Promotions: J'Leon Love, Badou Jack, Luis Arias, Ronald Gavril and Lanell Bellows. Mayweather won via unanimous decision with Guerrero winning the first 3 rounds, before Mayweather adjusted and won from the 4th to 12th round.

Reception

Mayweather's assistant trainer (his father) advised him onto a very defensive strategy, saying that "the less you get hit, the longer you last". This style of fighting elicited boos from the crowd especially during the 11th and 12th round when Floyd may have believed he had the score "locked up" already and didn't need to win any more rounds, saying that "When you're up on the cards, box smart."

Fight earnings
Floyd Mayweather equaled his own all time base purse record with a guaranteed $32 million. Robert Guerrero was guaranteed $3 million.

Fight Card

International broadcasting

† The GMA News TV version cancelled due to low ratings of Floyd Mayweather Jr. vs. Robert Guerrero, billed as May Day
†† AKTV on IBC coverage have stopped airing due to high blocktime costs of Mayweather-Guerrero fight during primetime telecast. The last AKTV sports block before its shut down on May 31, 2013.

References

External links
Floyd Mayweather Jr .vs. Robert Guerrero Official Fight Card from BoxRec
Floyd Mayweather Jr .vs. Robert Guerrero on Showtime
Golden Boy Promotions
Mayweather Promotions

Guererro
2013 in boxing
Boxing in Las Vegas
Boxing on Showtime
2013 in sports in Nevada
Golden Boy Promotions
May 2013 sports events in the United States
MGM Grand Garden Arena